Kori Rae is a film producer for Pixar. She produced several Mater's Tall Tales shorts and the feature films Monsters University and Onward.

Personal life
Rae is married to Darla K. Anderson, also a Pixar producer, who produced Monsters, Inc.. They live together in Noe Valley, San Francisco.

They met in 1991 when Anderson, a San Francisco newcomer, joined a softball team that Rae managed. Anderson and Rae started dating in 2001, during the last year of Monsters, Inc. Since then, they have decided not to work together on the same films. They first married on Presidents' Day 2004 while San Francisco was issuing same-sex marriage licenses, but those licenses were voided by the state Supreme Court.

They married again in 2008, after that court declared same-sex marriage legal but before Proposition 8 took effect.

Filmography

References

External links
 

American film producers
Bisexual artists
LGBT producers
Living people
Pixar people
People from the San Francisco Bay Area
LGBT people from California
Year of birth missing (living people)